Anuwat Noicheunphan (born September 21, 1988) is a Thai professional footballer who plays as a defensive midfielder.

International career

In March, 2015 Anuwat debuted for Thailand in a friendly match against Singapore.

International

Honours

Club
Buriram United
 Thai League 1 (1): 2018
 Thailand Champions Cup (1): 2019

References

External links
 Anuwat Noicheunphan at Goal
https://int.soccerway.com/players/anuwat-noicheunphan/287134/

1988 births
Living people
Anuwat Noicheunphan
Anuwat Noicheunphan
Association football midfielders
Anuwat Noicheunphan
Anuwat Noicheunphan
Anuwat Noicheunphan
Anuwat Noicheunphan
Anuwat Noicheunphan
Anuwat Noicheunphan